In mathematical logic, the Kanamori–McAloon theorem, due to , gives an example of an incompleteness in Peano arithmetic, similar to that of the Paris–Harrington theorem. They showed that a certain finitistic theorem in Ramsey theory is not provable in Peano arithmetic (PA).

Statement

A function  where  is said to be regressive if  for all  not containing 0.

See also
Paris–Harrington theorem
Goodstein's theorem
Kruskal's tree theorem

References

Independence results
Theorems in the foundations of mathematics